Woodrow Lamar Campbell (born September 26, 1944) is an American and a former collegiate and professional football player. He played for the Houston Oilers in the American Football League and in the National Football League, and was an AFL All-Star in 1967. 

Campbell served as a military policeman in the 1st Infantry Division of the United States Army during the Vietnam War.

See also
Other American Football League players

References

External links
NFL.com player page

1944 births
Living people
People from Gadsden County, Florida
American football running backs
Northwestern Wildcats football players
Houston Oilers players
American Football League All-Star players
American Football League players
United States Army personnel of the Vietnam War
United States Army soldiers
American military police officers